Marie-Anne Fragonard, née Gérard, (1745–1823) was a French painter of portrait miniatures.

Known for being the wife of the painter Jean-Honoré Fragonard since 1769, she also painted miniatures, which, after having long been attributed to her husband, were returned to her name by the historian Pierre Rosenberg. She painted in a free and easy style, which was close to the style of Jean-Honoré.

See also
 Marguerite Gérard (sister)

References

 Fragonard Besançon Pierre Rosenberg, Claudine Lebrun and Claire Stoullig, Museum of Fine Arts and Archaeology of Besancon, 2006 ed. 5 continents, 2006 ( and 9788874393633).

1745 births
1823 deaths
18th-century French painters
19th-century French painters
18th-century French women artists
19th-century French women artists
French portrait painters
Portrait miniaturists
People from Grasse
French women painters